Clonmel Racecourse (Powerstown Park) is a horse racing venue in the town of Clonmel, County Tipperary, Ireland which stages both National Hunt and Flat racing.

The course is located in the Powerstown area of the town 2 km from the town centre. It is a right handed track of one and a quarter miles with a stiff uphill finish. Racing has taken place at the venue for over 150 years. In November, the Grade 2 Clonmel Oil Chase, has been contested and won by some notable horses.

Notable races

References

External links
Official website
Go Racing Profile
Racing Post Profile

 
Horse racing venues in the Republic of Ireland
Buildings and structures in Clonmel
Sports venues in County Tipperary